Lady Windermere's Fan is a 1916 British silent comedy film directed by Fred Paul and starring Milton Rosmer, Netta Westcott and Nigel Playfair. It was the first film adaptation of Oscar Wilde's 1892 play Lady Windermere's Fan. A print of the film still exists and it has been released on DVD by the British Film Institute.

Cast
 Milton Rosmer - Lord Windermere
 Netta Westcott - Lady Windermere
 Nigel Playfair - Lord Augustus Lorton
 Irene Rooke - Mrs Erlynne
 Arthur Wontner - Lord Darlington
 Alice De Winton - Duchess of Berwick
 E. Vivian Reynolds - Mr Dumby
 Joyce Kerr - Agatha
 Evan Thomas - Cecil Graham
 Sydney Vautier - Hopper

References

External links

1916 films
1910s English-language films
Films based on Lady Windermere's Fan
Films directed by Fred Paul
1916 comedy films
British comedy films
British silent feature films
Ideal Film Company films
British black-and-white films
1910s British films
Silent comedy films